The 1954 United States Senate election in Michigan was held on November 2, 1954. Incumbent Republican U.S. Senator Homer S. Ferguson ran for re-election to a third term, but was defeated by the Democratic Detroit Board of Education member Patrick V. McNamara.

Democratic primary

Candidates
Patrick V. McNamara, member of the Detroit Board of Education
Blair Moody, former interim Senator (1951–52) (died July 20, 1954)

Campaign
The campaign was cut short abruptly when Blair Moody died of a heart attack fourteen days before the August 3 primary.

Results

General election

Results

See also 
 1954 United States Senate elections

References 

1954
Michigan
United States Senate